Christoph Ehlich (born 2 February 1999) is a German footballer who plays as a right-back for SpVgg Unterhaching.

Career
Ehlich made his professional debut for SpVgg Unterhaching in the 3. Liga on 6 April 2019, coming on as a substitute in the 70th minute for Hong Hyun-seok in the 0–4 away loss against Karlsruher SC. In January 2020, Ehlich joined Regionalliga Bayern side TSV 1860 Rosenheim on loan until the end of the season.

References

External links
 Profile at DFB.de
 Profile at kicker.de

1999 births
Living people
German footballers
Association football fullbacks
SpVgg Unterhaching players
TSV 1860 Rosenheim players
3. Liga players
Regionalliga players
People from Ebersberg (district)
Footballers from Bavaria